Bachia blairi is a species of lizard in the family Gymnophthalmidae. The species is native to Central America.

Etymology
The specific name, blairi, is in honor of American businessman Henry Sterling Blair, a manager of United Fruit Company in Panama, who was also an amateur herpetologist.

Geographic range
B. blairi is found in Costa Rica and Panama.

Habitat

Description
B. blairi has reduced limbs. Each front leg has four digits, and each hind leg has three digits. Its body coloration is similar to P. pallidiceps. However, B. blairi does not have a bright, light-colored lateral stripe.

Behavior
B. blairi is terrestrial and semifossorial, living in the leaf litter of undisturbed rainforest.

Reproduction
The mode of reproduction of B. blairi is unknown.

References

Further reading
Dunn ER (1940). "New and Noteworthy Herpetological Material from Panama". Proceedings of the Academy of Natural Sciences of Philadelphia 92: 105–122. (Scolecosaurus blairi, new species, p. 115).
McDiarmid RW, DeWeese JE (1977). "The systematic status of the lizard Bachia blairi (Dunn, 1940) (Reptilia: Teiidae) and its occurrence in Costa Rica". Brenesia 12/13: 143–153. (Bachia blairi, new combination).
Savage JM (2002). The Amphibians and Reptiles of Costa Rica: A Herpetofauna between Two Continents, between Two Seas. Chicago and London: University of Chicago Press. 954 pp. . (Bachia blairi, p. 520).

Bachia
Reptiles described in 1940
Taxa named by Emmett Reid Dunn